The 2010 Rotor Volgograd season was the 1st season that the club played in the Russian First Division.

Squad 

 (captain)

Transfers

Winter 2009/2010

In:

Out:

Summer

In:

Out:

Competitions

Friendlies

First Squad

Reserve Squad

Russian First Division

Results

Table

Russian Cup

Statistics

Squad Statistics

League

Minutes Played

    
    
    
    
    
    • Player in Application    x Player Couldn't Play Against a Team that Owned    * Player Dismissed from Field

Goal scorers

Discipline

All Tournaments

Appearances and goals

|-
|colspan="14"|Players who completed the season with other clubs:

|}

Top Scorers

Disciplinary Record

Team Statistics

Home attendance

Домашняя посещаемость

General Statistics

References

FC Rotor Volgograd seasons
Rotor